Anthonie Michal Ferreira (born 13 April 1955) is a former South African first-class cricketer. He spent eight seasons playing for Warwickshire where he was a solid middle order batsman and accurate and dependable medium pace bowler. He made 777 runs and took 79 wickets in 1984.

External links

1955 births
Living people
South African cricketers
South African Universities cricketers
Northerns cricketers
Warwickshire cricketers
South African cricket coaches